Triveni Ghat is a ghat situated in Rishikesh, Uttarakhand. It is the biggest and most famous ghat in Rishikesh at the banks of Ganges. Triveni Ghat remains overcrowded with devotee to take ritual baths to get cleansed from their sins. It is believed that the ghat was visited by Lord Krishna when he got hurt by the arrow of Jara – a hunter. Being the most venerated ghat in Rishikesh, Triveni Ghat is even used by devotees to perform the last rites and rituals of their loved ones. The ghat is famed for the Ganga aarti performed to the chants of Vedic hymns. The sight of oil leaves, filled with diya and petals, which are released by devotees, floating on the pristine Ganga and the traditional aarti is a sight to behold. On the bank of Triveni Ghat, one can visit the Gita Mandir and Lakshminarayan Temple. Dawn boat ride along the Ganges is a must on a short tour to Triveni Ghat.

Gallery

Rishikesh
Ghats of India